Leningrad Nuclear Power Plant ( Leningradskaya atomnaya elektrostantsiya; Leningradskaya AES) is a nuclear power plant located in the town of Sosnovy Bor in Russia's Leningrad Oblast, on the southern shore of the Gulf of Finland, some  to the west of the city centre of Saint Petersburg.

The Leningrad NPP was the first power station in Russia to operate the RBMK type of reactor. Despite its age, in 2012 and 2013 the Leningrad NPP took the third place in the annual contest for the Best Nuclear Power Plants of the Year. The plant has four nuclear reactors of the RBMK-1000 type, all of which are first generation units similar to that of Kursk and Chernobyl units 1 and 2. Each unit has a separate reactor building but the turbine hall is shared between 2 reactors. In 2008, construction started on Leningrad II with 2 VVER-1200 type reactors. They will eventually replace the RBMK units as they are shut down due to age.

From May 2012 to December 2013, Unit 1 was offline while repairs were made related to some deformed graphite moderator blocks.

Reactor data

Incidents and accidents
The first accident at the plant occurred shortly after the first unit came online. On 7 January 1975, a concrete tank containing radioactive gases from Unit 1 exploded; there were no reported accident victims or radiation releases.

Less than a month later, on 6 February 1975, the secondary cooling circuit of Unit 1 ruptured, releasing contaminated water into the environment. Three people were killed, and the accident was not reported in the media.

On 28 November 1975, a fuel channel in Unit 1 suffered a loss of coolant, resulting in the degradation (partial meltdown) of a nuclear fuel assembly that led to a significant release of radiation lasting for one month. The exposed inhabitants of the Baltic region were not notified of the danger. The accident was not reported in the media. The Ministry of Medium Machine Building blamed the accident on poor construction, rather than on the inherent instability of the reactor design, in an attempt to cover up the accident. The commission investigating the incident made several recommendations to improve safety of RBMK reactors, but they were not implemented. Practically the same accident occurred in Unit 1 of the Chernobyl Power Station in 1982

In July 1976 and again in September 1979, due to a poor safety culture, a fire broke out in a concrete vault containing radioactive waste. Water used in extinguishing the fires was contaminated, leaked into the environment, and entered the water table. This was not reported in the media.

On 28 December 1990, during refurbishment of Unit 1, it was noticed that the space between the fuel channels and the graphite stack (contaminated during the 1975 accident) had widened. The contaminated graphite was spilled, and the radiation levels in the space under the reactor increased. Radiation was detected 6 km away from the unit, but this was not reported in the media.

On 3 December 1991, due to faulty equipment and lax safety rule compliance, 10 new fuel rods were dropped and damaged. The staff tried to conceal the accident from the plant's management.

In March 1992, an accident at the plant leaked radioactive gases and iodine into the air through a ruptured fuel channel. This was the first accident at the station that was announced in the media.

On 27 August 2009, the third unit was stopped when a hole was found in the discharge header of a pump. According to the automated radiation control system, the radiation situation at the plant and in its  monitoring zone was normal. The plant's management refuted rumors of an accident and stated that the third unit was stopped for a "short-term unscheduled maintenance", with a restart scheduled for 31 August 2009.

On 19 December 2015, unit 2 was stopped (scrammed) due to a broken steam pipe. No radioactively contaminated material was released.

On 21 December 2018, the first unit of Leningrad NPP was shut down for decommissioning. The defueling process is expected to take until 2023. Once all the used fuel has been removed, decommissioning can begin.

Electricity generation

Production of Leningrad Units 1–4, 1974-2017 (TWh/year)

Leningrad II Nuclear Power Plant 

In December 2019, Leningrad II-1 was integrated into the district heating system of Sosnovy Bor and the local industrial park, replacing the heating capacity of the closed RBMK-1000 units. The thermal output is 3200 MW.

On 25 October 2008, Saint Petersburg Atomenergoproekt began concreting the foundation plate of the reactor building of the Leningrad Nuclear Power Plant II, Unit 1. The cost of the project was estimated at almost 70 billion Russian rubles (about $3 billion US dollars at the time).  A construction licence was issued on 22 July 2009. In October 2018, Leningrad II-1 started commercial operation, and Leningrad II-2 was scheduled for the start of commercial operation in 2021. Leningrad II unit 2 entered commercial operation on March 22, 2021. Leningrad II-3 and II-4 are planned, but construction has not yet started. Once complete, all four nuclear reactors are estimated to have an annual electricity output of 32.8 million kWh. Each reactor is also estimated to generate approximately 9.17PJ/yr of district heating.

Gallery

See also

Nuclear power in Russia

References

External links

Leningrad NPP  – official website of the plant 
Leningrad Nuclear Power Plant – official website from operator 
Ecologists Slam Nuclear Power Plant

Nuclear power stations built in the Soviet Union
Nuclear power stations in Russia
Nuclear power stations using RBMK reactors
Nuclear power stations using VVER reactors
Nuclear power stations with reactors under construction
Nuclear power stations with proposed reactors
1974 establishments in Russia